Anania gobini is a moth in the family Crambidae. It was described by Koen V. N. Maes in 2005. It is found in South Africa and Eswatini.

References

Moths described in 2005
Pyraustinae
Moths of Africa